The Technological Educational Institute of Eastern Macedonia and Thrace (TEI EMT; ; formerly Technological Educational Institute of Kavala, TEIKAV) was a public institute providing university-level education in Eastern Macedonia and Thrace. The institute has three campuses; the main campus in St. Lukas, Kavala, and additional campuses in Drama and Didymoteicho, Evros regional unit. The TEI of Kavala had 13,500 registered students in the academic year 2007–08, ranking seventh among the 16 technological educational institutes in Greece in terms of students.

History 

The TEI of Kavala was founded in 1976, and its current form is a result of many institutional reforms and changes. Originally established as an educational centre for vocational studies under Presidential Decree 748/76 and Law 652/70, it was recognised in 1983 as an institute of technology by Law 1404/83. In 2001 it was upgraded to a higher educational institute by Law 2916/01 and since 2007 it is recognised as a university-level institute (Law 3549/07). However, the term university is not widely used, because the term technological educational institute (TEI for short) is more common throughout Greece.

Departments 
In its earlier (1976–1983) forms, the TEI of Kavala consisted of six departments: Electrical Engineering, Mechanical Engineering, Petroleum Engineering, Sciences, Accounting, and the Foreign Languages and Physical Education Centre. In 1983, the first four were allocated to the newly formed School of Engineering Sciences and the remaining two to the School of Business and Economics. In 1985 the first campus outside of Kavala was established in the nearby city of  Drama; the Department of Forestry and Natural Environment Management was the first department that established there. In 1986, the Department of Business Administration was founded and integrated into the School of Business and Economics.

During the period 1999–2007, the institute underwent an expansion, with the creation of four more departments, originally financed by the European Union through the Operational Programme for Education and Initial Vocational Training. The new departments are Industrial Informatics (1999) and Information Management (2000), located in Kavala; Landscape Architecture (2003), located in Drama; and Nursing (2007), located in Didymoteicho, in the eastern part of Evros regional unit of Thrace.

Following the establishment of the Department of Landscape Architecture, a third school, the School of Agricultural Technology, was established in the Institute. In 2009, the Department of Oenology was founded and integrated into the Drama Branch.

Facilities 

 TEI of Kavala's facilities were originally located in leased buildings around Kavala. In 1992 these facilities relocated to the new main campus in St. Lukas. Developed by Michaniki S.A., the campus buildings were arranged in an amphitheatre-style structure, overlooking the gulf of Kavala.

The Drama Campus is located in Microchori, Drama. The Department of Landscape Architecture is located in the city of Drama, in facilities granted by the regional unit of Drama. The Didymoteicho Campus is accommodated in the historic Primary School in the centre of Didymoteicho.

The main library, in operation since 1988, has a collection of over 32,000 volumes. It subscribes to 17 electronic sources (on-line databases, digital libraries, statistical databases) and provides access to 550 scientific journals. In comparison with other TEIs, the library in Kavala is ranked sixth in number of books.<ref>A. Sitas, A. Elissaiou, and K. Sioki. The Technological Education Institutes in Greece and Their Libraries, Libri 49, 51–58 (1999)</ref> Libraries are also located at the Drama and Didymoteicho campuses.

 Academic evaluation 

An external evaluation of all academic departments in Greek universities will be conducted by the Hellenic Quality Assurance and Accreditation Agency (HQAA) in the following years.

 Department of Information Management (2010) 
 Department of Business Administration (2011) 
 Department of Accounting (2011) 
 Department of Oil and Natural Gas Technologies (2011) 
 Department of Electrical Engineering (2012) 
 Department of Forestry and Natural Environment Management (2010) 
 Department of Landscape Architecture (2011) 

 Academic structure and administration 

The institute comprises three schools and thirteen departments. The following provides an overview of this structure and the number of students entering the institute per annum.

Kevala:

 School of Engineering Sciences
 Department of Petroleum Technology and Natural Gas (305)
 Department of Electrical Engineering (300)
 Department of Mechanical Engineering (300)
 Department of Informatics Engineering (300)
 Department of Sciences (–)

 School of Business and Economics
 Department of Accounting (500)
 Department of Business Administration (330)
 Department of Information Management (300)
 Department of Foreign Languages and Physical Education Centre (–)

Drama Campus:

 School of Agricultural Technology
 Department of Forestry & Natural Environment Management (150)
 Department of Landscape Architecture (150)
 Department of Oenology and Beverage Technology (independent) (100)

Didymoteicho Campus:

 Department of Nursing (150)

 Postgraduate/master's studies 

 Administration 
The institute is governed by the senate, the academic council, the president, and three vice-presidents. The academic council is composed of the president, three vice-presidents, three deans, the general secretary, and the student representative. Each vice-president deals with one of the following areas: academic affairs, economic affairs, and European and international affairs. Each school is governed by a dean that answers to a school board. The department heads and the student representatives participate in the school board. Each department is governed by a general assembly, a board, a general assembly, a head, and the managers of the sectors. Each department acts independently and has two or more sectors to which the members of educational staff of the department are allocated. Each department board consists of a head, sectors managers, and a student representative.

 Academic staff 
Educational duties in TEI of Kavala are carried out by the members of the permanent academic staff, consisting of professors, associate professors, assistant professors, and lecturers. The members of academic staff cooperate with temporary staff such as scientific and laboratory associates, laboratory technicians, and administrative staff. This mixed system (with both permanent and temporary staff), common in Greek institutes of technology, derives from the French model of grandes écoles.

 Master studies 
The following four master programmes are available:
 M.Sc. in Oil and Gas Technology. 
 Master in Business Administration - MBA. 
 M.Sc. in Management of Water Resources in the Mediterranean  
 Master of Science in Management Science and Information Systems  
 Master in Accounting, Audit and International Transactions 

 Ranking 
Kavala Institute of Technology is ranked first among the 16 institutes of technology and 16th among 40 universities and institutes throughout Greece. Globally, it is ranked in the first third (2,076th) of the world's top 12,000 universities as determined according to the indexes of the Cybermetrics Lab, which are based on the production and publication of scientific knowledge.

 Research and innovation 

The TEI of Kavala is actively involved in a variety of research areas, including computer science chemistry, chemical engineering, and material science. TEI of Kavala publishes two English-language scientific journals. The Journal of Engineering Science and Technology Review is edited by Prof. D. Bantekas. The journal's board includes Prof. D. Nanopoulos and Prof. E. Gazis. The journal is registered in research databases such as EBSCO Publishing and the Directory of Open Access Journals,) and is included in CERN's recognised scientific journals. The International Journal of Economics Science and Applied Research'' is edited by Prof. Α. Κarasavvoglou from the Department of Accounting.
Both journals are published in electronic and printed form and access to the journals is free.

TEI of Kavala has made significant investments in research infrastructure, including laboratory equipment for the promotion of knowledge in specific fields. Among those, the small-angle X-ray scattering and the scanning electron microscope in the Centre for In-Situ Studies permits the in-situ combination of different experimental methods for the static and dynamic (in process) study of nanomaterials. Others laboratories include the Water Quality Laboratory, the Petroleum Chemistry Laboratory, the Materials Laboratory, the Photovoltaic Laboratory, and the Microcomputers Laboratory.

In 2004, the academic staff founded the Technology Research Centre of East Macedonia and Thrace (Presidential Decree 36/ΦΕΚ 30/06-02-04). This is a legal entity of private law focused on innovation in the areas of radiation, fuels, marbles, new products design, marketing, informatics, and environment. The centre has overseen the development of innovative technologies, including the survivor-detection robotic vehicle R.OX.AN.E, for which the centre was awarded a prize at the Athens Digital Week 2009 exhibition. The centre has organised an Innovation Festival since 2010. The centre is a regular participant in exhibitions in Thessaloniki and Thrace; at a recent exhibition in Thrace, the Prime Minister of Greece, George Papandreou, inspected recent technological advances made at the TEI of Kavala.

KavTech has been actively involved in many international cooperative programmes over the past ten years, such as ERASMUS, COMETT, LINGUA, PETRA, TEMPUS, EUROFORM, TEXT, EURASHE, SOCRATES, and bilateral international cooperation programs with Slovenia and Georgia. It has been also actively involved in international research projects such as Alpha, EU DG-Research Vth Framework, (Medmont /QLK5-2000-01031), (Controcam /QLK5-2000-01684), Interreg IIIB CADSES, (Governet/3B084), Interreg III A Phare CBC Greece-Bulgaria (Dra-Smo 2.1–67), Interreg III B Archimed (Acronym Managmed A.1 113.31), Greece-Jordan Hellenic Aid (YDAS 44.8), and Interreg IV-C South East.

Student life 
TEI of Kavala offers an active student life; students can participate in the institute's theatre group, music groups, and painting and hagiography ateliers. Available sports include football, basketball, and volleyball teams that participate with distinction in the Universiade. There is great interest in the martial-arts team, the aerobics team, and the traditional dances group in which the Pontian and Cretan Student Associations are active. Other active cultural associations are the Cypriot and Thessalian Student Associations as well as the Graduates of the Department of Forestry. The Pontian Student Association is the oldest in the Institute (1984), and has constructed a monument in memory of the genocide of Pontian Greeks that was inaugurated by the then-President of the Republic, Konstantinos Stefanopoulos. The association has represented the AEIs of Greece in the cultural festival of Santa Napa (1993).

Student political parties 
Each school has an elected student association. Associations representing the major Greek political parties contribute to the public discussion for the organisation and structure of higher education in Greece. The student associations are legal entities of private law.

Student exchange programs 
TEI of Kavala is a member of a number of networks to enhance internationalisation. For instance, TEI of Kavala is highly active in Socrates, Erasmus Mundus, Leonardo da Vinci, Associations des Formations Européennes à la Comptabilité et l'Audit, Euroweek-Primenetworking, European Taxation and Accounting in Practice, International Student Olympias of Business Administration, and others. Student groups from TEI of Kavala regularly participate with distinction in Euroweek.

English for Specific Professional Purposes Certificate (E.S.P.P.C.) 
The Kavala Institute of Technology (TEIK) offers a chance to its students/graduates to certify their knowledge in English in their fields of study. To this end, the Centre of Foreign Languages & Physical Education of the TEIK has carried out an examination system, namely E.S.P.P.C., since 2009. The level of the test according to the Council of Europe's Vantage Level is (B2 +) for general language proficiency. E.S.P.P.C. is  protected by copyright and its purpose is to test candidates’ ability to understand and produce written language in English in their own scientific domain.

Specifically the test examines:

 Technical and academic writing
 Reading comprehension
 Language awareness

Certificates for passing candidates are issued both by the Centre of Foreign Languages & Physical Education and the Administration of the Kavala Institute of Technology with the general characterization "PASS".

The E.S.P.P.C. exams constitute an innovative, pioneer movement of the Centre of Foreign Languages & Physical Education made solely out of consideration for the students of the Kavala Institute of Technology, whose needs for new qualifications are determined by the international working environment.

Events 
Many distinguished scientists and personalities have delivered lectures in TEI of Kavala. TEI of Kavala welcomed Professor Dimitris Nanopoulos to talk about the Large Hadron Collider in May 2009. Patriarch Theophilos III of Jerusalem presented "The Jerusalem Patriarchate and the meaning of Sacred Pilgrimages" in July 2009. Painter G. Kordis presented The art of image as a visual creation in November 2009. The Rector of Sorbonne, Eleni Glykatzi-Ahrweiler, presented "The Pontian Greeks and their intellectual life" in January 2010, and journalist S. Fyntanidis talked about Journalism and personality protection in March 2010. TEI of Kavala organises a variety of events, including international conferences.

Seals and emblems 
The TEI of Kavala's official seal is the Tripod of Philippi with lion's feet and three handles, two of which are side-handles decorated with strands by three beams. Above the tripod there is a laurel branch, and on the right side there is a long-handled axe. This tripod was originally used on the tetradrachma coin, dating from the period 356-345 B.C. The other side of the coin depicts the head of the young Hercules wearing a lion's skin. When Philip II of Macedon conquered the Mount Pangaio goldmine in 358 B.C., he renamed the ancient Crenides to Philippi, and minted the race (drachma), the dolphin (half-drachma), the bow (silver stater), and the Phrygian cap (gold stater) coins, on which the tripod emblem was depicted.

References

External links 
 Hellenic Quality Assurance and Accreditation Agency (HQAA) 
  Department of Information Management, HQAA Final Report, 2010 
 Department of Business Administration, HQAA Final Report, 2011 
 Department of Accounting, HQAA Final Report, 2011 
 Department of Oil and Natural Gas Technologies, HQAA Final Report, 2011 
 Department of Electrical Engineering, HQAA Final Report, 2012 
 Department of Forestry and Natural Environment Management, HQAA Final Report, 2010 
 Department of Landscape Architecture, HQAA Final Report, 2011 
 "ATHENA" Plan for Higher Education  
 Official website 
 TEI of Kavala Services and Offices 
 TEI of Kavala Virtual Tour 
 TEI of Kavala DASTA Office (Career Office & Innovation Unit) 
 TEI of Kavala Special Account for Funds and Research 
 TEI of Kavala Internal Quality Assurance Unit 
 Greek Research & Technology Network (GRNET) 
 okeanos (GRNET's cloud service) 

Kavala
Education in Eastern Macedonia and Thrace
Educational institutions established in 1976
Kavala
1976 establishments in Greece
Buildings and structures in Kavala (regional unit)
Buildings and structures in Evros (regional unit)